These are lists of Pakistani cricketers

Captains

 List of Pakistan national cricket captains

Test

 List of Pakistan Test cricketers
 List of Pakistan Test wicket-keepers

One-day International

 List of Pakistan ODI cricketers

Twenty20

 List of Pakistan Twenty20 International cricketers

References